Roxborough Sporting Complex is a sporting and cultural complex in Roxborough, Trinidad and Tobago.

History
Located adjacent to the Windward Road, which is the main road on the eastern side of Tobago, the Complex played host to one first-class cricket match in the 2000–01 Busta Cup between Trinidad and Tobago and West Indies B. Trinidad and Tobago won the match by 79 runs, with Dinanath Ramnarine taking ten-wickets in the match, which included match-winning figures of 6 for 81 in the West Indies B second innings.

See also
List of cricket grounds in the West Indies

References

External links
Roxborough Sporting Complex at ESPNcricinfo

Cricket grounds in Trinidad and Tobago